Lypsimena nodipennis is a species of beetle in the family Cerambycidae. It was described by Hermann Burmeister in 1865. It is known from Argentina, Uruguay and Brazil.

References

Pogonocherini
Beetles described in 1865